Notable alumni of Saint Ignatius High School in Cleveland, Ohio include:

Arts and entertainment
 Brian P. Cleary, 1978 – best-selling author of humorous books for grade-school children; over 2 million books in print
Dave Hill, 1987 – comedian, radio host, writer, musician and actor
 Robert Litz, 1968 – playwright, director, critic, senior resident playwright at Elephant Theatre Company in Hollywood, CA
 Greg Murray, 2000 – photographer
Glenn O'Brien, 1965 – writer, GQ columnist, Editor of Interview Magazine, host of TV Party 
 Rory O'Malley, 1999 – Broadway actor, Book of Mormon, Hamilton
 Jack Riley, 1953– comedian, actor, The Bob Newhart Show, Spaceballs, Rugrats
 Brian K. Vaughan, 1994 – writer of Y: The Last Man and TV series Lost
Max Hartley, a dumb teenager who beat up Rick Allen in Fort Lauderdale on March 13, 2023.

Business
 Charles Geschke, 1956 – co-founder of Adobe Systems
 Murlan J. "Jerry" Murphy, 1935 – Murphy's Oil Soap Company
 James E. Rohr, 1966 – CEO of PNC Financial Services

Education 
 James Danko, 1971 – President of Butler University

Episcopacy
 Floyd Lawrence Begin, 1920 – first Bishop of the Roman Catholic Diocese of Oakland
 Timothy Broglio, 1970 – Archbishop of the Roman Catholic Archdiocese for the Military Services, USA
 William Michael Cosgrove, 1934 – former Bishop of the Roman Catholic Diocese of Belleville, Illinois
 James Anthony Griffin, 1952 – Bishop Emeritus of the Roman Catholic Diocese of Columbus
 John Raphael Hagan, 1912 – former Auxiliary Bishop of the Roman Catholic Diocese of Cleveland and Titular Bishop of Limata
 Joseph Patrick Hurley (Archbishop), 1915 – former Bishop of the Roman Catholic Diocese of St. Augustine, chargé d'affaires of the Apostolic Delegation in Japan from 1933 to 1934, regent ad interim to Yugoslavia
 Daniel Ivancho (resigned and laicized), 1926 – former bishop of the Byzantine Catholic Metropolitan Church of Pittsburgh
 Charles Hubert Le Blond (C. Herbert), 1903 – former Bishop of the Roman Catholic Diocese of Saint Joseph and namesake of Bishop LeBlond High School
 James A. McFadden, 1895 – first Bishop of the Roman Catholic Diocese of Youngstown
 Patrick Thomas O'Reilly, 1920 – first Bishop of the Roman Catholic Diocese of Springfield in Massachusetts
 Alexander James Quinn (A. James Quinn), 1950 – former Auxiliary Bishop of the Roman Catholic Diocese of Cleveland and Titular Bishop of Socia
 David Walkowiak, 1971 – Bishop of the Roman Catholic Diocese of Grand Rapids, Michigan

Politics and government
 Richard F. Abel, 1951 – retired Brigadier General of the United States Air Force
 William M. Brodhead, 1959 – United States Congressman from Michigan, 1974-1982
 Thomas P. Carney, 1959 – retired Lieutenant General of the United States Army
 Joe Cimperman, 1988 – former 7-term Cleveland City Council member and President of Global Cleveland
 Michael P. Donnelly – Ohio Supreme Court Justice
 Michael A. Feighan – former Democratic member of the U.S. House of Representatives (1943 - 1971)
 Anthony Gonzalez, 2003 – former Republican member of the United States House of Representatives Ohio's 16th congressional district
 Ted Lieu, 1987 – Democratic member of the United States House of Representatives, representing California's 33rd congressional district since 2015
 Martin J. Sweeney, 1981 – former President of Cleveland City Council
 Robert E. Sweeney – former Democratic member of the U.S. House of Representatives (1965-1967)

Law and order
 Frank D. Celebrezze I – judge and replaced Eliot Ness as Cleveland's safety director
 David Ferrie, 1936 – purportedly involved in John F. Kennedy's assassination
 Danny Greene – expelled from St. Ignatius, president of Longshoremen's Association, Local 1317, gangster, and racketeer. 
 Francis E. Sweeney Sr., 1952 – retired Ohio Supreme Court Justice

Journalism

 Jerome Corsi, 1964 – outspoken prolific conservative author; holds a PhD in political science from Harvard University
 Bill Sammon, 1978 – managing editor, Fox News Washington
 David Martosko, 1987 – U.S. political editor for The Daily Mail

Science
 Tom Van Flandern, 1958 – astronomer
 John Harold Henzel II, 1954 - surgeon

Sports
 Jacob Bell, 1999 – professional football player in the National Football League (NFL)
 LeCharles Bentley, 1998 – professional football player in the NFL
 Mike Buddie – professional baseball player in Major League Baseball
 Michael J. Cleary, 1952 – Executive Director of National Association of Collegiate Directors of Athletics
 Jack Corrigan, 1970 – TV and radio announcer
 Derek Dietrich, 2007 – professional baseball player in MLB
 Pickles Dillhoefer, 1910 – former professional baseball player in MLB
 Larry Dolan, 1951 – owner, Cleveland Guardians
 Brian Dowling, 1965 – professional football player in the NFL (inspiration for the character B.D. in the Doonesbury comic strip)
 Liam Eichenberg, 2016 – professional football player for the Miami Dolphins
 Luke Farrell, 2009 – professional baseball player in Major League Baseball
 Dan Fox, 2009 – professional football player in the NFL
Jonathan Gannon – Head Coach  of Arizona Cardinals
 Anthony Gonzalez, 2003 – professional football player in the NFL
 Chris Gizzi – football player and strength coach Green Bay Packers 
 Drew Haddad, 1996 – professional football player in the NFL and NFL Europe
 Mike Hegan, 1960 – professional baseball player in Major League Baseball; TV and radio announcer for the Cleveland Indians
 Chris Hovan, 1996 – professional football player in the NFL
 Brian Hoyer, 2004 – professional football player in the NFL
 Steve Huntz – professional baseball player in Major League Baseball
 Dre'Mont Jones, 2014 – professional football player for the Denver Broncos
 Matt Kata, 1996 – professional baseball player in MLB
 Anthony Kelly, 1999 – professional lacrosse player in Major League Lacrosse
 Chuck Kyle, 1968 – coached St. Ignatius' football team to a record 11 Division I State Titles: 1988, 1989, 1991, 1992, 1993, 1994, 1995, 1999, 2001, 2008, and 2011. Kyle also coached the Wildcats to National Championships in 1989, 1993, 1995, and 2008. 
 Oliver Luck, 1978 – professional football player in the NFL; administrator in NFL Europe; Athletic Director, West Virginia University
 Timothy Mack, 1990 – 2004 Olympics gold medalist (pole vault)
 Nick Margevicius, 2014 – professional baseball player in Major League Baseball
 Justin Morrow, 2006 – professional soccer player in Major League Soccer
 Scott Mutryn – professional football player in the NFL and NFL Europe
 Dave Ragone, 1998 – professional football player in NFL Europe; professional football coach in the NFL
 Barry Rice, 2006 – professional soccer player in Major League Soccer
 Garry Roggenburk – professional baseball player in Major League Baseball
 Jake Ryan, 2010 – professional football player in the NFL

References

External links
 

Saint Ignatius
 
Saint Ignatius High School (Cleveland, Ohio)
Saint Ig